The 2020–21 season was the 97th season in the existence of AEK Athens F.C. and the 60th competitive season and sixth consecutive in the top flight of Greek football. The season was affected by the COVID-19 pandemic and all the games were played behind closed doors. They competed in the Super League, the Greek Cup and the Europa League. The season began on 19 September 2020 and finished on 16 May 2021.

Players

Squad information

NOTE: The players are the ones that have been announced by the AEK Athens' press release. No edits should be made unless a player arrival or exit is announced. Updated 16 May 2021, 23:59 UTC+3.

Transfers

In

Summer

Winter

Out

Summer

Winter

Loan out

Summer

Winter

Notes

 a.  Beitar Jerusalem keeps 40% of the player's rights.

 b.  plus €1,000,000 bonuses.

 c.  plus 15% of resale fee.

Renewals

Overall transfer activity

Expenditure
Summer:  €5,050,000

Winter:  €400,000

Total:  €5,050,000

Income
Summer:  €6,500,000

Winter:  €0

Total:  €6,500,000

Net Totals
Summer:  €1,450,000

Winter:  €400,000

Total:  €1,050,000

Pre-season and friendlies

Super League Greece

Regular season

League table

Results by Matchday

Fixtures

Play-offs

Table

Results by Matchday

Fixtures

Greek Cup

AEK entered the Greek Cup at the sixth round.

Sixth round

Quarter-finals

Semi-finals

UEFA Europa League

Qualifying

Group stage

The group stage draw was held on 2 October 2020.

Statistics

Squad statistics

! colspan="13" style="background:#FFDE00; text-align:center" | Goalkeepers
|-

! colspan="13" style="background:#FFDE00; color:black; text-align:center;"| Defenders
|-

! colspan="13" style="background:#FFDE00; color:black; text-align:center;"| Midfielders
|-

! colspan="13" style="background:#FFDE00; color:black; text-align:center;"| Forwards
|-

! colspan="13" style="background:#FFDE00; color:black; text-align:center;"| Left during Summer Transfer Window
|-

! colspan="13" style="background:#FFDE00; color:black; text-align:center;"| Left during Winter Transfer Window
|-

|-
|}

Disciplinary record

|-
! colspan="20" style="background:#FFDE00; text-align:center" | Goalkeepers

|-
! colspan="20" style="background:#FFDE00; color:black; text-align:center;"| Defenders

|-
! colspan="20" style="background:#FFDE00; color:black; text-align:center;"| Midfielders

|-
! colspan="20" style="background:#FFDE00; color:black; text-align:center;"| Forwards

|-
! colspan="20" style="background:#FFDE00; color:black; text-align:center;"| Left during Summer Transfer window

|-
! colspan="20" style="background:#FFDE00; color:black; text-align:center;"| Left during Winter Transfer window

|-
|}

Starting 11

References

External links
AEK Athens F.C. Official Website

AEK Athens F.C. seasons
AEK Athens
AEK Athens